NUL may refer to:
 National University of Lesotho
 National Urban League, US civil rights organization
 Nul (band) or NuL, a South African band
 Nul, rulers of a Galactic Empire in Brian Aldiss's Bow Down to Nul

Computers
 The abbreviation for the null character in many character sets
 The NUL: device in DOS and related systems